Planctogystia parvulus is a moth of the family Cossidae. It is found in Madagascar.

This is a large, heavy moth with a wingspan of 40 to 64 mm. The frontwings are whitish, covered with cossid reticulations, including a fairly marked median line. On the costa there are 5 black spots. The hindwings are uniformly dark grey.

References

Cossinae
Moths described in 1914
Moths of Madagascar
Moths of Africa